Francisco Escudero may refer to:

 Francisco Escudero Casquino, Peruvian politician
 Francisco Escudero García de Goizueta (1912–2002), Spanish composer
 Paquito Escudero (Francisco Escudero Martínez, born 1966), former Spanish footballer
 Francisco Escudero (Mexican politician), Mexican Secretary of Foreign Affairs 1913
 Francis Escudero, a Filipino senator.